Russell Hastings Millward (April 5, 1877 – October 1958) was an inventor, author, photographer and an explorer.  He claimed that he held the world record for travelling by foot in "unexplored, uncharted portions of Africa, South and Central America and Mexico".

Biography
Russell Hastings Millward was born on April 5, 1877 in Cincinnati, Ohio to Francis Millward and Margaret Ann Jones. He attended University of Illinois College of Law and later Columbia University.

In 1912 there were rumors that he married Madeline Ethel Sylvester.

In 1912 Millward declared that the jungles of Guatemala were the richest in the world with their hardwoods, rubber and chicle.

In 1913, during the Mexican Revolution, William Randolph Hearst misused a Millward image of children playing in the ocean in British Honduras for propaganda. It was portrayed as "children [that] were driven into the water, forced to hold their hands above their heads, and shot in the back."

He married Edna Pearl Boyden of Boston on August 27, 1914.

In 1934 a group of explorers proposed a "geographic theater" to be located in Manhattan devoted to "programs combining motion pictures, lantern slides, lectures and native music and dancing". Millward was to be the program director.

He died in October 1958 in Pembroke, Massachusetts.

Memberships
He was a fellow of the Royal Geographical Society, and he was a lifetime corresponding member of the New York Zoological Society and the American Museum of Natural History.

Patents

Footnotes

Works
The Dolls of Cuerna Vaca (1910)

External links

Russell Hastings Millward object at the National Museum of the American Indian
 Found Ruins of an Ancient Empire Buried Deep in Guatemalan Jungles, New York Tribune, September 1, 1912, p. 2 / p. 7

1877 births
1958 deaths
American explorers
National Geographic Society
People associated with the American Museum of Natural History
Fellows of the Royal Geographical Society